Zanetor (pronounced Zɑ-nɛ-tɔ) Agyeman-Rawlings (Dr.)  (born June 1, 1978) is Ghanaian medical doctor and politician who is the eldest daughter of the 1st President under the 4th Republic of Ghana Jerry Rawlings (1993–2001) and former first lady Nana Konadu Agyeman (1993–2001). She is a member of the Ghanaian parliament for the Klottey-Korle Constituency and a medical doctor and humanitarian.

Early life and education
Agyeman-Rawlings was born on 1 June 1978 in Accra, Ghana in West Africa. She hails from Dzelukope in the Volta Region of Ghana. She attended the North Ridge Lyceum school and Achimota School for her basic education. She then graduated from the Wesley Girls High School in Cape Coast in 1996.

With her father being on the political platform, as a child Zanetor spent most of her time with her mother, the former first lady, Nana Konadu Agyeman Rawlings.
Zanetor attended the Royal College of Surgeons in Ireland for her medical degree. She also has certificates in defense management and conflict and crisis management from the Ghana Armed Forces Command and Staff College.

Career

Medical career 
Agyeman-Rawlings worked as a medical doctor in general practice early in her career. She has participated in various foundations and initiatives championing women's and children's right and improving sanitation in Ghana.

Humanitarian work
Agyeman-Rawlings has led relief efforts to alleviate the plight of many victims of circumstance. In June 2015, she led a team to donate relief items to victims of the Goil Oil fire and flood disaster which took the lives of about 150 Ghanaians and displaced many. She also built a bridge for the Osu Anorhor community which has helped reduce the issue of floods and easy transportation in the community.
In March, 2014, Dr. Rawlings was a special guest of the exceptional Meeting of African Women in the framework of the crans-Montana Forum on Africa and the South-South Cooperation in Dakhla, which was aimed at promoting a more humane and impartial world.

Politics
Agyeman-Rawlings had remained outside the mainline political spotlight for most of her life. In June 2015, while she was serving as an Ambassador for TV3's fundraising campaign, "TV3 June 3 Disaster Support Fund", which was aimed at raising funds to support the victims of the 3 June flood and fire disaster, there were reports which suggested she was using her relief effort to launch a political campaign. She denied the reports stating that her activities over the weeks were geared towards raising funds for the victims of the disaster.

Parliamentary bid 
On September 11, 2015, Dr. Agyeman-Rawlings filed her nomination papers to contest the Korle Klottey parliamentary primaries as a Member of Parliament, running against incumbent Korle Klottey MP Nii Armah Ashitey and Leeford Kpakpo Quarshie.

At the filing of her nominations, she maintained she had no prior political ambitions and her decision to contest was recent. Her involvement, according to her, was based on popular calls for political involvement, borne out of her cleaning campaign and other environmental activism. Her father, the former president, has since endorsed his daughter's decision.

Member of Parliament 
She won the 10 November 2015 primaries for Korley Klottey constituency in the Greater Accra Region and went on to win the seat in the 2016 Ghanaian general election held on 7 December 2016. She is currently an MP for the Klottey Korle Constituency. She serves on the Gender and Children Committee and Environment, Science and Technology Committee. She retained her seat In the 2020 general elections.

Personal life 
Zanetor Agyeman-Rawlings has three children.

See also 

 Nana Konadu Agyeman Rawlings.
 Jerry John Rawlings

References

External links 

Living people
Medical doctors from Accra
National Democratic Congress (Ghana) politicians
1978 births
People educated at Wesley Girls' Senior High School
Ghanaian general practitioners
Ghanaian MPs 2017–2021
Ghanaian MPs 2021–2025
Alumni of the Royal College of Surgeons in Ireland
People from Volta Region